William Dishington (died c.1360) was a Scottish noble. 

He had charters issued for lands in Balglassie, Aberlemno, and Tollyquhondland by Robert the Bruce. William was known to be an associate of Alexander Ramsay in 1338. He died c. 1360.

Marriage and issue
William married Elizabeth, daughter of Robert de Brus, jure uxoris Earl of Carrick, and Marjorie, Countess of Carrick, they are known to have had the following issue:
William Dishington of Ardross, married heiress of John Burnard of Ardross.
John Dishington of Longhermiston.

References
Wood, Walter. The east neuk of Fife: its history and antiquities. 1862.

Year of birth unknown
Year of death unknown
13th-century Scottish people
14th-century Scottish  people